Platycleis is a genus of bush crickets described by Fieber in 1853, belonging to the subfamily Tettigoniinae. The species of this genus are present in Europe, North Africa and temperate Asia.

Biology
Studies conducted in 2010 at the University of Derby by Karim Vahed, Darren Parker and James Gilbert found that the tuberous bushcricket (Platycleis affinis) has the largest testicles in proportion to body mass of any animal recorded. They account for 14% of the insect's body mass and are thought to enable a fast re-mating rate.  Platycleis albopunctata is the grey bush cricket and occurs in the British Isles.

Species
The Orthoptera Species File lists the following accepted species:

 Platycleis affinis Fieber, 1853
 Platycleis albopunctata (Goeze, 1778)
 Platycleis alexandra (Uvarov, 1926)
 Platycleis buzzettii Massa & Fontana, 2011
 Platycleis concii Galvagni, 1959
 Platycleis curvicauda Podgornaya, 1988
 Platycleis escalerai Bolívar, 1899
 Platycleis falx (Fabricius, 1775)
 Platycleis fatima Uvarov, 1912
 Platycleis grisea (Fabricius, 1781) - type species (as Locusta grisea Fabricius)
 Platycleis iberica Zeuner, 1941
 Platycleis iljinskii Uvarov, 1917
 Platycleis intermedia (Serville, 1838)
 Platycleis irinae Sergeev & Pokivajlov, 1992
 Platycleis kabulica Bey-Bienko, 1967
 Platycleis kashmira (Uvarov, 1930)
 Platycleis kibris Ünal, 2012
 Platycleis latitabunda Stolyarov, 1968
 Platycleis longicauda Tarbinsky, 1930
 Platycleis meridiana Stolyarov, 1969
 Platycleis pamirica (Zeuner, 1930)
 Platycleis pathana Zeuner, 1941
 †Platycleis pongraczi Zeuner, 1929
 Platycleis ragusai Ramme, 1927
 Platycleis rahmoiensis Jaiswara & Shah, 2022
 Platycleis romana Ramme, 1927
 Platycleis sabinegaali Garai, 2011
 Platycleis sabulosa Azam, 1901
 Platycleis sogdiana Mistshenko, 1954
 †Platycleis speciosa (Heer, 1865)
 Platycleis trivittata Bey-Bienko, 1951
 Platycleis turanica Zeuner, 1930
 Platycleis waltheri Harz, 1966

Gallery

References

External links
 

Tettigoniinae
Tettigoniidae genera